Aaroniella is a genus of loving barklice in the family Philotarsidae. There are more than 40 described species in Aaroniella.

Species
These 48 species belong to the genus Aaroniella:

 Aaroniella achrysa (Banks, 1941)
 Aaroniella andrei Thornton, 1991
 Aaroniella antennata Thornton & Smithers, 1977
 Aaroniella badonneli (Danks, 1950)
 Aaroniella bakeri Thornton, 1981
 Aaroniella betschi Badonnel, 1976
 Aaroniella bruchi (Williner, 1943)
 Aaroniella caribe (Mockford & Evans, 1976)
 Aaroniella chamelana Garcia Aldrete, 1996
 Aaroniella crista New & Thornton, 1975
 Aaroniella curtifurca Li, 2002
 Aaroniella dentata Mockford & Evans, 1976
 Aaroniella festiva Mockford & Evans, 1976
 Aaroniella flexa Li, 2002
 Aaroniella galapagensis Thornton & Woo, 1973
 Aaroniella glabra New & Thornton, 1975
 Aaroniella glossoptera (Roesler, 1940)
 Aaroniella grandiocula Li, 2002
 Aaroniella gressitti Thornton, Lee & Chui, 1972
 Aaroniella guttulata (Banks, 1916)
 Aaroniella gyratigra Li, 2002
 Aaroniella hoffmannae Garcia Aldrete, 1996
 Aaroniella howensis Smithers & Thornton, 1975
 Aaroniella kepongensis New & Lee, 1992
 Aaroniella lobata Cole, New & Thornton, 1989
 Aaroniella lombokensis Thornton, 1981
 Aaroniella maculosa (Aaron, 1883)
 Aaroniella madecassa Badonnel, 1967
 Aaroniella maligawa Thornton, 1981
 Aaroniella mauritiensis Turner, 1976
 Aaroniella montana Badonnel, 1967
 Aaroniella multipunctata Li, 1995
 Aaroniella nebulosa Vaughan, Thornton & New, 1991
 Aaroniella pardina Li, 1999
 Aaroniella pedunculata Thornton & Smithers, 1977
 Aaroniella pterosoma Thornton, 1981
 Aaroniella pulchra Thornton, 1959
 Aaroniella rawlingsi Smithers, 1969
 Aaroniella recta New & Thornton, 1975
 Aaroniella reunionensis Turner, 1976
 Aaroniella samoana (Karny, 1932)
 Aaroniella serialis (Banks, 1937)
 Aaroniella sinuosa Mockford, 1996
 Aaroniella spenceri Thornton, 1981
 Aaroniella stictica (Navas, 1932)
 Aaroniella sudarmani Vaughan, Thornton & New, 1991
 Aaroniella ternata Li, 1999
 Aaroniella trukensis Thornton, Lee & Chui, 1972

References

Psocomorpha
Articles created by Qbugbot